Poompuhar Shipping Corporation Limited is a state-government undertaking of Government of Tamil Nadu located in the Indian state of Tamil Nadu. This corporation runs ships to ferry the coal to the thermal power stations operated by TANGEDCO and it also runs boats in tourist town of Kanyakumari.

References

External links 

Companies based in Chennai
Shipping companies of India
Indian companies established in 1974
Government-owned companies of India
1974 establishments in Tamil Nadu